Gigi Pritzker (born July 27, 1962) is an American billionaire and film producer. She is a member of the Pritzker family.

Pritzker is co-founder of the film production and financing company Odd Lot Entertainment, producing several films including Rabbit Hole, Drive, and Hell or High Water. Pritzker has also produced for TV, including The Dragon Prince, which won the 2020 Emmy for Outstanding Children's Animated Series.

Early life
Jean Pritzker was born to the wealthy Pritzker family in Chicago, Illinois, the daughter of Marian "Cindy" (née Friend) and Jay Pritzker. Her maternal grandfather was Prague-born jurist Hugo Friend. Her father, along with his brothers, Robert and Donald Pritzker, diversified the Chicago-based family business, the Marmon Group. They created the Hyatt Hotel chain in 1957 and owned Braniff Airlines from 1983 until 1988, later divesting many assets. 

Pritzker graduated with a BA in anthropology from Stanford University.

Career
After taking courses in documentary filmmaking, Pritzker, along with Deborah Del Prete, co-founded the Culver City, California-based film production and financing company Odd Lot Entertainment. In 2010, Odd Lot produced the film Rabbit Hole, starring Nicole Kidman, and in 2011, the film Drive, starring Ryan Gosling. In November 2013, Odd Lot released Ender's Game a film, co-starring Harrison Ford and based on Orson Scott Card's science fiction novel.

Prizker, along with her with partner Ted Rawlins, co-lead the company Relevant Theatricals, which develops and produces live stage productions, including the play Million Dollar Quartet.

Personal life
Prizker is married to Michael Pucker and has three children.

Filmography
Pritzker was a producer in all films unless otherwise noted.

Film

Thanks

Television

References

External links

American people of Ukrainian-Jewish descent
American billionaires
Film producers from Illinois
American women film producers
Female billionaires
Stanford University alumni
Gigi
Living people
1962 births
People from Chicago
American independent film production company founders
21st-century American Jews
21st-century American women
Jewish American film producers